SJCS could refer to one of several things:

 Saint Jude Catholic School (disambiguation)
 Seattle Jewish Community School (SJCS)
 St John's College School
 St. Joseph's College School